Baby is a 2002 German drama film directed by Philipp Stölzl, starring Alice Dwyer, Lars Rudolph and Filip Peeters. It tells the tragic story of a father, his daughter and the father's best friend, after the wives of the two men have died in a car crash. The film was Stölzl's feature-film debut.

Cast
 Alice Dwyer as Lilli
 Lars Rudolph as Paul
 Filip Peeters as Frank
 Christian Grashof as Stiefel
 Hamid Bundu as Tommy
 Irina Platon as Lana
 Mischa Hulshof as Johann
 Fedja van Huêt as Polizist
 Marc Prätsch as Wachmann
 Illa Schöppe as Ramona

Release
The film premiered on 2 July 2002 at Filmfest München. It was released theatrically in Germany on 26 February 2004.

Reception
David Rooney of Variety wrote:
A suspenseful melodrama about an unorthodox family unit, Baby represents a slick but distancing feature debut for German commercials and musicvideo director Philipp Stolzl, who made clips for Rammstein, Faith No More, Garbage and Madonna, among others. Blighted by a script that fails to create even one engaging character with any evident emotional transition, the film aims for a droll, dark register but comes off as merely smug and cold.

References

External links 
 

2002 drama films
2002 films
Films directed by Philipp Stölzl
German drama films
2000s German-language films
2000s German films